William Earl "Bill" Reid (August 13, 1934 – May 28, 2013) was a Canadian politician. He was a political figure in British Columbia, Canada known locally as "Mr. Surrey". He represented Surrey from 1983 to 1986 and Surrey-White Rock-Cloverdale from 1986 to 1991 in the Legislative Assembly of British Columbia as a Social Credit member. "That was the best job I ever had in my whole life," said Reid. "I was the Minister of Tourism from '86 to '91, when Expo 86 was on and we had the best place in the world to visit."

Early years
Reid was born in Nelson, British Columbia, the son of William Earl Reid and Dolly Renwick, and was educated in Chilliwack. Prior to politics, he owned and operated a car dealership in Surrey.

Local politics
He served as an alderman for Delta from 1973 to 1978. Reid also was chairman of the board for the Metro Transit Authority.

Provincial politics
Reid ran in the 1972 provincial elections as a Progressive Conservative candidate for Surrey, but did not win. He later joined the Social Credit Party and won in the Surrey riding in 1983. With only one riding, Reid was responsible for the entire city of Surrey at that time. Reid served as government whip in the provincial assembly. Reid also served in the provincial cabinet as Minister of Tourism, a position that had an especially high-profile during Expo 86. In 1989, Reid was fired from cabinet after it was discovered he had funnelled a $277,000 lottery grant to two friends, and the matter was referred to the Attorney General's office. The ministry declined to lay charges, which erupted into a scandal after allegations were made that Attorney General Bud Smith had improperly intervened in the proceedings.

Final decades and legacy
Reid retired from provincial politics in 1991 and devoted the remainder of his life to his community.

In 2012, Reid was awarded the Queen's Diamond Jubilee award, which was given to Canadians who have made significant contributions to their communities.

The City of Surrey named him Good Citizen of the Year in 2013 due to 50 years of community service including work with societies such as Cloverdale Chamber of Commerce, Surrey Spirit of B.C. committee, Surrey Heritage Society and Cloverdale Rodeo and Exhibition Association. Bill Reid Place, a transitional shelter was constructed in Cloverdale.

Reid died at the age of 78 on May 28, 2013, from a rare cancer.

In 2014, the city planned three legacy projects:
 renaming Cloverdale Millennium Amphitheatre to Bill Reid Millennium Ampitheathre
 naming a portion 62nd Avenue as Bill Reid Way
 a public sculpture (estimated cost $70,000) by artist Paul Slipper.

References 

1934 births
2013 deaths
British Columbia municipal councillors
British Columbia Conservative Party candidates in British Columbia provincial elections
British Columbia Social Credit Party MLAs
Deaths from cancer in British Columbia
Members of the Executive Council of British Columbia
People from Nelson, British Columbia
People from Surrey, British Columbia
Tourism ministers of British Columbia
20th-century Canadian politicians